Taz Tatarsky is a rural locality (a village) in Klyapovskoye Rural Settlement, Beryozovsky District, Perm Krai, Russia. The population is 174 as of 2010.

Geography 
Taz Tatarsky is located on the Taz River, 11 km southeast of  Beryozovka (the district's administrative centre) by road. Taz Russky is the nearest rural locality.

References 

Rural localities in Beryozovsky District, Perm Krai